The 2009 North American Under 21 World Qualifier Speedway tournament

Notes
Ricky Wells will automatically be guaranteed a spot in the Qualifying Round of the World Under 21 Championships
The 2009 Champion was crowned by a Main Event win not by points

Points
August 21, 2009
 Auburn, California
Qualify: 1
Listed in overall finishing order not by high points

Semi 1

Semi 2

Main Event

2009
North American Under 21 World Qualifier, 2009
North American Under 21 World Qualifier
Speed